Maria Kozyreva (born 22 May 1999) is a Russian tennis player.

Kozyreva has a career high WTA singles ranking of 725 achieved on 27 June 2022. She also has a career high WTA doubles ranking of 612 achieved on 3 October 2022.

Kozyreva won her first major ITF title at the 2022 Tyle Pro Challenge in the doubles draw partnering Ashley Lahey.

ITF finals

Singles: 1 runner–up

Doubles: 7 (5 titles, 2 runner–ups)

References

External links 

 
 

1999 births
Living people
Russian female tennis players